Ramichloridium musae is an ascomycete fungus that is a plant pathogen infecting bananas.

External links 
 Index Fungorum
 USDA ARS Fungal Database

Fungal plant pathogens and diseases
Banana diseases
Ascomycota enigmatic taxa